Sakagami Dam is a gravity dam located in Gifu Prefecture in Japan. The dam is used for power production. The catchment area of the dam is 1022.9 km2. The dam impounds about 32  ha of land when full and can store 1839 thousand cubic meters of water. The construction of the dam was started on 1952 and completed in 1953.

References

Dams in Gifu Prefecture